"Have You Heard?" is a popular song written by Lew Douglas, Frank LaVere and LeRoy W. Rodde and published in 1952. The biggest hit version was recorded by Joni James in 1952, charting the next year.  The recording by Joni James was released by MGM Records as catalog number 11390. It first reached the Billboard magazine charts on December 27, 1952 and lasted 14 weeks on the chart, peaking at #4. The flip side was "Wishing Ring."

The song was revived by the US group, The Duprees and became a hit again in 1963.  The version went to #18 on the Hot 100 and #8 on the Middle-Road Singles chart.

Other recorded versions
The Belmonts
Tony Brent
Lita Roza
Sonny Til and The Orioles
The Beverley Sisters
Bob Gibson & His Orchestra, Ross Higgins, vocal (Australia)

References

Songs written by Lew Douglas
1952 songs
Songs written by Roy Rodde
1963 singles
MGM Records singles